Metopivaria elongata is a species of beetle in the family Cerambycidae. It was described by Stephan von Breuning in 1976, originally under the genus Heterometopia.

References

Homonoeini
Beetles described in 1976